Steve Harrison (born October 25, 1966) is an American politician from the state of West Virginia. A member of the Republican Party, Harrison served in both the West Virginia House of Delegates and West Virginia Senate. He is currently the Clerk of the West Virginia House of Delegates.

Career
Harrison served in the West Virginia House of Delegates and West Virginia Senate for a total of 14 years. He opted not to run for reelection to the state Senate in 2006. Since retiring from the state Senate, Harrison has worked for Poca Valley Bank, and played as a placekicker for a semi-professional American football team. He also coaches track and field.

Harrison lost the May 2014 primary for the United States House of Representatives, running to represent  in the 2014 election. Incumbent Shelley Moore Capito was running for the United States Senate. Harrison had won a straw poll held by the Republican Executive Committee of Kanawha County, but ended up losing the primary.

Personal
Harrison received a bachelor's degree from Brown University. He is married.

References

External links
 

Living people
Republican Party members of the West Virginia House of Delegates
Republican Party West Virginia state senators
Place of birth missing (living people)
Brown Bears football players
1966 births
Politicians from Charleston, West Virginia
People from Cross Lanes, West Virginia